Edward Nichols, or similar names, may refer to:

 Edward Nicolls (1779–1865), Irish general of the British Royal Marines
 Edward Hugh Dyneley Nicolls, British engineer
 Edward T. Nichols (1823–1886), U.S. Navy rear admiral
 Edward Leamington Nichols (1854–1937), physicist
 Edward Nicholl (1862–1939), British navy officer and MP
 Ed Nichols (1923–2020), New Zealand alpine skier
 Edward Hewitt Nichols (1923–2016), British colonial agriculture and aquaculture official
 Eddie Nicholls (born 1947), cricket umpire